Jørgen Jahre (29 October 1907 – 24 April 1998) was a Norwegian shipowner and sports official.

Jørgen Jahre was born in Tjølling, in Vestfold county, Norway. He was a nephew of Norwegian shipping magnate Anders Jahre. He was secretary of the Norwegian shipping company A/S Kosmos in Sandefjord until in 1939. In 1948 he went from being a manager in Sandar Fabrikker A/S to becoming a partner in Anders Jahre's company. He has been the president of the Norwegian Shipowners' Association.

He was the president of the Football Association of Norway from 1963 to 1965, and chairman of the Norwegian Olympic Committee from 1965 to 1969. Vice chairman during this period was Arne B. Mollén, who also became Jahre's successor.

Honors
Royal Norwegian Order of St. Olav - knighted in 1 Class
 Order of Dannebrog - knighted in 1 Class

References

1907 births
1998 deaths
People from Larvik
Norwegian businesspeople in shipping
Norwegian sports executives and administrators